Associação Desportiva e Recreativa São José, commonly known as São José, is a Brazilian football men's and women's club based in Palmas, Tocantins state. They competed in the Women's Copa do Brasil once.

History
The club was founded on February 14, 1997, as an amateur team, becoming a professional team in 2006, when they affiliated to the CBF.

Women's team
The women's team competed in the 2009 edition of the Copa do Brasil de Futebol Feminino, when they were eliminated in the First Round by Caucaia.

Stadium
Associação Desportiva e Recreativa São José play their home games at Estádio Nilton Santos. The stadium has a maximum capacity of 10,000 people.

References

Football clubs in Tocantins
Women's football clubs in Brazil
Association football clubs established in 1997
1997 establishments in Brazil